Elachista metella is a moth of the family Elachistidae that is found in France, Switzerland, Austria, the Czech Republic, Slovakia, Hungary, Slovenia, Croatia and Bulgaria.

References

External links
Lepiforum.de

metella
Moths described in 2002
Moths of Europe